Charles "Chick" Harper (birthdate unknown) was a Negro leagues pitcher and outfielder for several years before the founding of the first Negro National League.

References

External links
 and Baseball-Reference Black Baseball stats and Seamheads

Year of birth missing
Year of death missing
Detroit Stars players
Kansas City Monarchs players
Baseball pitchers
Kansas City Giants players
Kansas City Royal Giants players